Luke Holmes (born March, 1990 in Oldham, England) is an English retired footballer.

References

External links
 
 Akron bio

1990 births
Living people
English footballers
English expatriate footballers
Footballers from Oldham
Akron Zips men's soccer players
FC London players
Flint City Bucks players
Wilmington Hammerheads FC players
Expatriate soccer players in Canada
Expatriate soccer players in the United States
USL League Two players
USL Championship players
English expatriate sportspeople in the United States
English expatriate sportspeople in Canada
Association football forwards